Guido Burgstaller (born 29 April 1989) is an Austrian professional footballer who plays as a striker for Rapid Wien.

Club career

Cardiff City
On 23 May 2014, Burgstaller joined Cardiff City on a three-year deal as Ole Gunnar Solskjær's second signing of the summer, after Javi Guerra. Burgstaller said "My decision to join Cardiff City was never in question when the club first contacted me, it has always been a dream for me to play in this country. I've followed Cardiff in the Premier League last season and I'm very proud and honoured to be given the chance to wear the Cardiff City jersey – I'm a big admirer of the passion of the fans."

He made his debut in the Championship on 8 August, replacing Kenwyne Jones for the last 20 minutes of a 1–1 draw at Blackburn Rovers on the opening day of the season. Five days later, he scored within four minutes of his first start as Cardiff won 2–1 away to Coventry City in the first round of the League Cup.

On 26 January 2015, Burgstaller left Cardiff by mutual consent, joining 2. Bundesliga side Nürnberg on an undisclosed deal four days later.

Schalke 04
On 12 January 2017, Burgstaller joined Schalke 04 for an undisclosed fee. At the time, he was top scorer in the 2. Bundesliga with fourteen goals, and was signed as the Royal Blues had only one fit striker in Eric Maxim Choupo-Moting. On 21 January, he scored on his debut, the only goal of the match in a win over Ingolstadt. Afterwards, Burgstaller had an inconsistent run in terms of goalscoring in the Bundesliga, but braces against Augsburg, Wolfsburg and Bayer Leverkusen helped him become Schalke's top scorer with nine goals.

In Burgstaller's first full season as a Schalke player, he was named as Domenico Tedesco's top striker, following the departures of Choupo-Moting and Klaas-Jan Huntelaar. His first goal of the season came against Stuttgart, and in October, he scored in three consecutive matches, including in a DFB-Pokal second round tie against Wehen Wiesbaden. On 25 November, he netted the first goal in a 4–4 draw against Borussia Dortmund, in a match where Schalke were 4–0 down at halftime. On 7 February 2018, Burgstaller scored the only goal of the match in a win over Wolfsburg, taking them to the DFB-Pokal semi-finals for the first time since the 2010–11 season.

FC St. Pauli
In September 2020, having terminated his contract with Schalke 04, Burgstaller moved to 2. Bundesliga club FC St. Pauli. He agreed a three-year contract with FC St. Pauli.

Return to Rapid Wien
In June 2022, Burgstaller returned to Rapid Wien, for which he played from 2011 to 2014, signing a two-year contract.

International career
Burgstaller made his full international debut for his country on 29 February 2012, playing the last five minutes of a 3–1 friendly win over Finland as a replacement for Andreas Ivanschitz.

He scored his first goal for Austria on 6 October 2017, netting the 1–1 equalizer in a 3–2 win against Serbia.

He retired from the national team on 26 August 2019.

Career statistics

Club

International

Scores and results list Austria's goal tally first, score column indicates score after each Burgstaller goal.

References

External links

 Guardian Football

Living people
1989 births
Sportspeople from Villach
Footballers from Carinthia (state)
Association football forwards
Austrian footballers
Austria international footballers
Austrian Football Bundesliga players
2. Liga (Austria) players
English Football League players
Bundesliga players
2. Bundesliga players
SK Rapid Wien players
FC Kärnten players
SC Wiener Neustadt players
Cardiff City F.C. players
1. FC Nürnberg players
FC Schalke 04 players
FC St. Pauli players
Austrian expatriate footballers
Austrian expatriate sportspeople in Wales
Expatriate footballers in Wales
Expatriate footballers in Germany